The 1964 Appalachian State Mountaineers football team was an American football team that represented Appalachian State Teachers College (now known as Appalachian State University) as a member of the Carolinas Conference during the 1964 NAIA football season. In their fifth year under head coach Jim Duncan, the Mountaineers compiled an overall record of 6–3, with a mark of 3–2 in conference play, and finished third in the Carolinas Conference.

Schedule

References

Appalachian State
Appalachian State Mountaineers football seasons
Appalachian State Mountaineers football